The Gracie Allen Murder Case is a 1939 American comedy mystery film taken from the Philo Vance series by writer S.S. Van Dine and directed by Alfred E. Green from a screenplay by Nat Perrin. The film stars the female member of the comedy duo Burns and Allen Gracie Allen, Warren William, Ellen Drew, Kent Taylor, Judith Barrett, Donald MacBride and Jed Prouty. The film was released on June 2, 1939, by Paramount Pictures.

Plot
The zany plot of the movie follows nitwit Gracie Allen trying to help master sleuth Philo Vance solve a murder. Allen's uncle fixes her up with Bill at a company picnic. When the two go out to a nightclub that night, Gracie inadvertently links Bill to the murder of a thug after finding the dead body and Bill's cigarette case at the scene of the crime. While being questioned at the club, she meets Vance who's investigating the homicide. After Gracie's bungled attempts to solve the case, Vance decides it might be easier to have her working with him. Despite Gracie's "help," the two eventually find the real killer.

Cast
Gracie Allen as Gracie Allen
Warren William as Philo Vance
Ellen Drew as Ann Wilson
Kent Taylor as Bill Brown
Judith Barrett as Dixie Del Marr
Donald MacBride as Dist. Atty. John Markham
Jed Prouty as Uncle Ambrose
Jerome Cowan as Daniel Mirche
H. B. Warner as Richard Lawrence
William Demarest as Police Sgt. Ernest Heath
Sam Lee as Thug 
Al Shaw as Thug
Richard Denning as Fred
Irving Bacon as Hotel Clerk
Lillian Yarbo as Maid (uncredited)

References

External links 
 

1939 films
American comedy mystery films
1930s comedy mystery films
Paramount Pictures films
Films directed by Alfred E. Green
American black-and-white films
1930s parody films
American parody films
1939 comedy films
1930s English-language films
1930s American films
Philo Vance films
Gracie Allen